Johan Bertilsson (born 15 February 1988) is a Swedish footballer who plays as a midfielder for Degerfors IF in Allsvenskan.

References

External links

1988 births
Living people
Swedish footballers
Association football midfielders
Degerfors IF players
Jönköpings Södra IF players
Kalmar FF players
Gefle IF players
Östersunds FK players
Dalkurd FF players
Örebro SK players
Allsvenskan players
Superettan players
Ettan Fotboll players
Sweden youth international footballers
Swedish expatriate footballers
Expatriate footballers in Poland
Swedish expatriate sportspeople in Poland
Zagłębie Lubin players
Ekstraklasa players